Carsten Sänger (born 8 November 1962) is a German former footballer.

Club career 
In the DDR-Oberliga the defender played only for FC Rot-Weiß Erfurt. After the German reunification Sänger was under contract for a couple of East German clubs but never played in the 1. Bundesliga. He had to end his career after his lower leg had to be amputated after a car accident.

International career 
Sänger won 16 caps for East Germany in the mid-1980s.

References

External links
 
 
 
 

1962 births
Living people
German footballers
East German footballers
East Germany international footballers
Association football defenders
FC Rot-Weiß Erfurt players
FC Hansa Rostock players
FC Sachsen Leipzig players
FC Carl Zeiss Jena players
2. Bundesliga players
German amputees
Sportspeople from Erfurt
Footballers from Thuringia